Unheard is an Indian Telugu-language historical fiction drama streaming television series created and directed by Aditya K. V. for Disney+ Hotstar. The series has an ensemble cast of Srinivas Avasarala, Priyadarshi Pulikonda, Ajay, Baladitya, Chandini Chowdary, and Ananda Chakrapani. The series premiered on 17 September 2021.

Premise
Set in the period of 1905–1950, the series is based on the Indian independence movement in the Hyderabad State in common people's point of view on various major events during the said period.

Cast

 Baladitya as Dr. Chalapathi
 Chandini Chowdary as Padma
 Priyadarshi Pulikonda as Badri
 Ananda Chakrapani as Jailer Satyanarayana
 Ajay as Mallesh
 Srinivas Avasarala as Anwar
 Venkat as Ramaiah
 Jay Jha as Ahmed

Episodes

Production
Filming of the series was done between September and November 2020 following the COVID-19 protocols in and around Hyderabad. Cast and Crew were connected virtually for workshops on their individual roles. As the show pans decades, a lot of prosthetic work was involved on the cast to look appropriate for the year the sequences take place.

Themes 
Aditya is an author who wrote the book Daitya Dairies. After making 13 years of research on the events, he has written the story and making debut as the filmmaker. Deccan Chronicle reported that "The 1918 influenza pandemic, the Spanish flu, which killed around 25 million, is one of the important episodes. Mahatma Gandhi also suffered from the Spanish Flu and was in isolation. The series chronicles how these deaths fuelled the freedom moment. It was during this time the movement gained momentum and began to spread." The series also showcases the lives of the people of the period and the battle they had fought against British and the  Nizam of Hyderabad. Some of the major events that are shown are non-cooperation movement, chauri chaura incident and others.

Release 
Billed as the first Telugu Hotstar Specials show, all the episodes of the series were premiere on Disney+ Hotstar on 17 September 2021, although it was initially scheduled to premiere on 15 August 2021. The series was initially screened privately for the Vice President of India, Venkaiah Naidu. The show was also selected for screening at the 11th Dada Saheb Phalke Film Festival. In the United States, the show was streamed exclusively on Hulu.

Reception 
Sangeetha Devi Dundoo writing for The Hindu said, "If you can look past the staged theatre-like presentation, ‘Unheard’ can whet the appetite to know more about India's freedom struggle, through conflicting ideologies." Praising the performances, The Times of India critic Thadagadh Pathi wrote, "Actors like Ajay, Priyadarshi, Srinivas Avasarala, Chandini Chowdary and Baladitya deliver mature performances, which works well for the series. It is not an easy feat to perform such dialogue-driven characters and stories."

References

External links
 
Unheard at Disney+ Hotstar

Telugu-language web series
2021 web series debuts
Telugu-language Disney+ Hotstar original programming
Indian period television series
Indian historical television series
2021 Indian television series debuts
Indian drama television series
Indian independence movement fiction